Pollanisus lithopastus is a moth of the family Zygaenidae. It is found in Australia from northern New South Wales to Victoria and Tasmania. It is mostly found in mountainous areas at higher elevations, but has also been found at sea level, especially in Tasmania.

The length of the forewings is 8.5–9.5 mm for males and 7–8 mm for females. It is dark with silvery or golden farinose (covered with a white, mealy powder) wings.

External links
Australian Faunal Directory
Zygaenid moths of Australia: a revision of the Australian Zygaenidae

Moths of Australia
lithopastus
Moths described in 1926